Lysychnyky is a village (selo) in Chortkiv Raion of Ternopil Oblast, of Western Ukraine. The population of the village is just about 647 people. Local government is administered by the Kasperivska (Kasperivtsi)
village council. Lysychnyky belongs to Zalishchyky urban hromada, one of the hromadas of Ukraine.

Geography 
The village is situated along of the Seret River Area of the village totals is 2.510 km2 and is located at an altitude of 243 meters above sea level.

History and Attractions 
The first written record dates from 1641, although on the outskirts of the village archaeological sights of Upper Paleolithic and ancient culture were discovered.

Until 18 July 2020, Lysychnyky belonged to Zalishchyky Raion. The raion was abolished in July 2020 as part of the administrative reform of Ukraine, which reduced the number of raions of Ternopil Oblast to three. The area of Zalishchyky Raion was merged into Chortkiv Raion.

Religion
In 1898, the Church of the Protection of the Blessed Virgin Mary was consecrated.

References

External links 
 village Lysychnyky
 weather.in.ua

Villages in Chortkiv Raion